Avilla may refer to:
Avilla, Arkansas
Avilla, Indiana
Avilla, Missouri
Avilla Township, Comanche County, Kansas

See also

Ávila (disambiguation)